The Glassworks-Gabler House, also known as Building 302A, is an historic home which is located in Monongahela Township in Greene County, Pennsylvania. 

It was listed on the National Register of Historic Places in 1995.

History and architectural features
Built circa 1810, the Glassworks-Gabler House is a twoand-one-half-story, three-bay, vernacular, log dwelling, which sits on a rubblestone foundation. It has a rear kitchen addition that was erected during the twentieth century. The house was possibly built as part of the "New Geneva Glass Works Lot" for Albert Gallatin, an original investor in the New Geneva Glass Works.

It was listed on the National Register of Historic Places in 1995.

References 

Houses on the National Register of Historic Places in Pennsylvania
Houses completed in 1810
Houses in Greene County, Pennsylvania
National Register of Historic Places in Greene County, Pennsylvania